Gangsta Granny is a 2011 British children's comedy fiction book, written by David Walliams, illustrated by Tony Ross and published by HarperCollins. A sequel, Gangsta Granny Strikes Again, was released in 2021.

Plot
Ben, a curious boy, hates having to stay with his old Granny every Friday because his parents go to see a dancing show named "Strictly Stars Dancing" (a parody of Strictly Come Dancing). He finds it boring and repetitive as his Granny always feeds him cabbage-related dishes, most commonly cabbage soup and cabbage chocolate, and they are constantly playing Scrabble, plus her television hasn't been working since the 1990s. Ben loves plumbing and is a long-term subscriber to the magazine Plumbing Weekly, which he buys every week from Raj's news-agency. Ben's parents disapprove of him being a plumber, as their ambition for their only child was to be a professional ballet dancer like the one they used to watch every Friday.

One day, Ben calls his parents at Granny's house and asks them to take him home. Mum and Dad ignore Ben and disapprove of the proposal. Granny somehow overhears the conversation due to the indistinct sound made by Ben while he was talking. The next morning, his Granny seems somewhat upset and disappointed thinking that her grandson doesn't love her.

That same morning, Ben is served boiled eggs by Granny, which he doesn't like and he flicks the runny egg gloop onto the window and empties it into the plant which is beside the breakfast table. But, as he was hungry, he starts searching for something to eat; with some pocket left luck, he finds a box of chocolate biscuits. To his surprise, the tin feels much heavier than usual. Ben unscrews the lid and finds many diamonds, rings, bracelets, necklaces and earrings clustered together in the tin. Ben hears Granny approaching and quickly puts the tin back and sits back down at the table completely shocked!
He goes home and now can't wait to see his grandma again to find out about these jewels. But when his dad rings Granny up, she says she's too busy that evening to have Ben sleep over.

Film adaptation

The book has been adapted into a one-hour film for BBC One, which aired at Christmas in 2013.

Theatre adaptation
The book has also been adapted into a 130-minute theatre performance by the Birmingham Stage Company. It toured the United Kingdom until July 2017. It then became a play at the Garrick Theatre in the West End from 26 July to 3 September 2017.

Ride adaptation 
On 21 March 2020, Alton Towers Resort in Staffordshire, England launched David Walliams World, with the main theme of the area being focused on the Gangsta Granny book. The new area was to feature a 4D dark ride titled Gangsta Granny: The Ride, where guests embark on a crown jewels tour which is then sabotaged by Ben and Granny who persuade the guests to join them on a heist of a lifetime to steal the crown jewels. Gangsta Granny: The Ride finally opened on 17 May 2021.

References

2011 British novels
British crime novels
British novels adapted into films
British children's novels
Novels by David Walliams
2011 children's books
HarperCollins books